Israeli law is based mostly on a common law legal system, though it also reflects the diverse history of the territory of the State of Israel throughout the last hundred years (which was at various times prior to independence under Ottoman, then British sovereignty), as well as the legal systems of its major religious communities. The Israeli legal system is based on common law, which also incorporates facets of civil law. The Israeli Declaration of Independence asserted that a formal constitution would be written, though it has been continuously postponed since 1950. Instead, the Basic Laws of Israel (ħuqey ha-yesod) function as the country's constitutional laws. Statutes enacted by the Knesset, particularly the Basic Laws, provide a framework which is enriched by political precedent and jurisprudence. Foreign and historical influences on modern-day Israeli law are varied and include the Mecelle (Hebrew: מג'לה; the civil code of the Ottoman Empire) and German civil law, religious law (Jewish Halakha and Muslim Sharia; mostly pertaining in the area of family law), and British common law. The Israeli courts have been influenced in recent years by American Law and Canadian Law and to a lesser extent by Continental Law (mostly from Germany).

History
The modern judicial system in Palestine, later the State of Israel, was established by a British senior judicial officer, Orme Bigland Clarke, who was appointed by General Edmund Allenby in 1918, following the  British conquest. The British military administration of Palestine (1917-1920) was replaced with a civilian one which operated under the Constitution of Mandatory Palestine, promulgated through an Order in Council by the British monarch in 1922.

Britain, which in 1920 received a League of Nations mandate to govern Palestine, implemented the common-law system, except for the jury system.  Legal precedents in torts and  contracts were borrowed from England, and certain legal areas were codified in order to assure legal certainty.  Thus the penal code in Israel was practically the same as that used by the British in India or in other British colonies and territories.

On 14 May 1948 a Bill of Independence was signed as a manifesto for the new State of Israel.  While it was drafted as a universal and democratic declaration expressing noble ideas prevalent at the time, it is non-binding, although it has occasionally been used as a guiding tool by the courts.

With the establishment of the Israeli state, English law as it was on the date of independence remained binding, with post-1948 English law developments being persuasive and not binding. This was enabled by the first legislative act of the Provisional State Council, which enacted a reception statute as part of the "Law and Administration Ordinance" published on 19 May 1948, four days after the Declaration of Independence.

Some aspects of Turkish Ottoman law still remain operational , such as placing personal status and marriage law in the hands of religious courts. Also the Turks had adopted a  Napoleonic-style  land-registration system, through a successive Block and Lot entries. Many Turkish  land laws remain in force.

Following independence the young State of Israel was eager to gain recognition in the international arena by joining international treaties and participating heavily in the negotiations of international treaties, e.g., the 1929 Warsaw convention.

During the 1960s there was a rush to codify much of the common law in areas of contracts and torts.  The new laws blended common law, local case-law, and fresh ideas. In 1977 the Knesset codified the penal code. Since the 1990s the  Israeli Ministry of Justice, together with leading jurists, has been laboring on a complete recodification of all laws pertaining to civil matters.  This new proposed civil codex was introduced in 2006, but its adoption through legislation is expected to take many years, if not decades.

As a result of "Enclave law", large portions of Israeli law apply in Israeli settlements and to Israeli residents in the  occupied territories.

Court system

The Magistrate Court (Beit Mishpat Hashalom) handles civil cases of less than 2.5 million shekels, excluding disputes over the ownership of land, as well as criminal cases in which the maximum sentence is 7 years. Magistrate Courts are found in most Israeli towns. The Magistrate Court has 6 subdivisions. (1) The Juvenile Court deals with criminal offenses committed by people who were not 18 on the date of prosecution and some issues relating to the removal of children from parental custody. (2) The Family Court deals with all civil cases where the parties are close family members. (3) The Small Claims Court deals with cases of less than 30 thousand shekels. (4) "Hotsa'a Lapoal" is the bailiffs office for judgment debt collection. (5) The Traffic Court deals with all traffic offenses. (6) The Court of Local Issues deals with all offenses prosecuted by local authorities (parking tickets, planning violations etc.).

The District Court (Beit Mishpat Mehozi) deals with all civil and criminal matters not under the jurisdiction of the Magistrate Court, including disputes over the ownership of land. It has jurisdiction over most administrative cases and hears appeals from the Magistrate Court. There are six courts, one in each of Israel's districts: Jerusalem (also has extra jurisdiction of extra territorial matters), Tel Aviv, Haifa, Center (in Petah Tikva), South (in Beer-Sheva), and North (in Nazareth).

The Israeli Supreme Court (Beit Mishpat Elyon) mostly hears appeals from the District Court but also sits as the High Court of Justice and as such hears administrative cases not under the jurisdiction of the District Courts. Many political cases and cases of international interest are heard by the Supreme Court sitting as the High Court of Justice.

The Labour Tribunals (Batei Ha'din Le'avoda) hears all cases where the parties are employer and employee, all cases against the National Insurance Institute and some other socially oriented matters. it is an independent system composed of 5 district tribunals (Jerusalem, Tel-Aviv, Haifa, South and North) and one national tribunal in Jerusalem (Beit Ha'din Ha'artzi).

There are also religious tribunals in Israel. Some specific legal matters in Israel (e.g., matters of personal status such as marriage and divorce) come under the jurisdiction of the religious tribunal system. There is a list of legally recognized religious communities: Jewish, Muslim, Greek Orthodox Christian, Catholic Christian etc. The small Protestant Christian community in Israel is not recognized; the Jewish community for this purpose does not include the non-Orthodox denominations, Reform and Conservative. Each religious community has its own religious court. For example, Jewish weddings are sanctioned only by the local Religious Council, and divorces of Jews are handled exclusively by the Rabbinical Courts. The judges (dayanim) of the Jewish Rabbinical Courts are all Orthodox rabbis. Matters incidental to divorce such as distribution of property, child custody etc. are dealt with in the Family Courts, but the personal law of the parties will be applied.

The judges of the various courts are chosen by a committee comprising 9 members: 3 Supreme Court Judges, 2 government ministers (one is the Minister of Justice), 2 members of the Knesset (one from the opposition), and 2 representatives of the Israel Bar Association The composition of the committee is slightly different when it chooses Labour Court Judges or judges of the religious tribunals.

Current legislative proposals to alter the judicial system 
The 2023 Israeli judicial reform is a proposed series of changes to the judicial system and the balance of powers in Israel put forward by the current Israeli government, and spearheaded by Deputy Prime Minister and Minister of Justice Yariv Levin and the Chair of the Knesset's Constitution, Law and Justice Committee, Simcha Rothman. It seeks to curb the judiciary's influence over lawmaking and public policy by limiting the Supreme Court's power to exercise judicial review, granting the government control over judicial appointments and limiting the authority of government legal advisors. If adopted, the reform would grant the Knesset the power to override Supreme Court rulings by a majority of 61 or more votes, diminish the ability of the court to conduct judicial review of legislation and of administrative action, prohibit the court from ruling on the constitutionality of basic laws, and change the makeup of the Judicial Selection Committee so that a majority of its members are appointed by the government. The legislation is currently being considered by the Knesset and the relevant committees.

See also

Basic Laws of Israel
Israeli land and property laws
Prevention of Infiltration Law
Israeli nationality law
Nazis and Nazi Collaborators (Punishment) Law
2023 Israeli judicial reform

References

Bibliography 
 Shimon Shetreet, Walter Homolka, Jewish and Israeli Law – An Introduction, De Gruyter Boston/Berlin 2017.

External links
Israeli Law Guide
Basic Laws of the State of Israel from the Israel Ministry of Foreign Affairs
The Judiciary
The Bar of Israel
The Courts of Israel (Judicial branch of Israel)
The Knesset (Legislative branch of Israel)
Israeli Ministry of Justice (Executive branch body responsible for the judicial branch of Israel)
Contract Law of Israel
Regularly updating articles on law in Israel
Selection of articles for legal consumers in Israel